Agraecina is a genus of liocranid sac spiders that was first described by Eugène Louis Simon in 1932.

Species
 it contains six species, found in Africa, Europe, Spain, and Kazakhstan:
Agraecina canariensis Wunderlich, 1992 – Canary Is.
Agraecina cristiani (Georgescu, 1989) – Romania
Agraecina hodna Bosmans, 1999 – Algeria
Agraecina lineata (Simon, 1878) (type) – Western Mediterranean to Kazakhstan
Agraecina rutilia (Simon, 1897) – Sierra Leone
Agraecina scupiensis Deltshev, 2016 – Macedonia

See also
 List of Liocranidae species

References

Araneomorphae genera
Liocranidae
Spiders of Africa
Spiders of Asia